This list comprises all players who have participated in at least one league match for Cleveland City Stars since their first season in the USL in 2007. Players who were on the roster but never played a first team game are not listed; players who appeared for the team in other competitions (US Open Cup, CONCACAF Champions League, etc.) but never actually made an USL appearance are noted at the bottom of the page where appropriate.

A "†" denotes players who only appeared in a single match.

A
  Pato Aguilera
  Gerardo Alvarez

B
  Paul Ballard
  Teteh Bangura
  Joshua Boateng
  Sallieu Bundu
  Evan Bush

C
  Eric Carpenter
  Nigel Codrington
  Max Cream
  Stephen Cruickshank
  Jack Cummings

D
  John DeVae
  Glen Duerr

F
  Floyd Franks

G
  Leo Gibson
  Steve Gillespie
  Hunter Gilstrap
  Alioune Gueye
  Stéphane Guillaume

H
  John Michael Hayden
  Neil Hlavaty
  Jason Hotchkin
  Ben Hunter

J
  Randolph Jerome
  James Jaggard
  George Josten
  Ryan Junge

K
  Ibrahim Kante
  Warren Kanu
  Skelly Kellar
  Gordon Kljestan

L
  Kolby LaCrone
  Angelo Ladera
  Spencer Lappin
  Tre Lee
  Ian Leibbrandt
  Chris Lemons

M
  Kiel McClung
  Dana McGregor
  Ryan Miller
  Adam Moffat
  Brandon Moncrief

N
  Nate Norman

O
  Tomiwa Ogunsola
  Arsene Oka
  Musa Otieno

P
  Caleb Patterson-Sewell
  Anthony Peters
  Ricardo Pierre-Louis
  Derek Potteiger

R
  Eric Reed
  Stephen Rigby
  Troy Roberts
  Adam Ruud

S
  Kwame Sarkodie
  Mark Schulte
  Chris Seitz †
  Adriano Sella
  Israel Sesay
  Ryan Stewart
  Anthony Stovall

T
  Godfrey Tenoff
  Jeremy Tolleson
  Aaron Tredway

V
  Julian Valentin

W
  Austin Washington †
  Josh Westermann
  Luke Williams

Z
  Jed Zayner

Sources

Cleveland City Stars
 
City Stars players
Association football player non-biographical articles